Micralcinus is a genus of true weevils in the beetle family Curculionidae. There are about five described species in Micralcinus.

Species
These five species belong to the genus Micralcinus:
 Micralcinus cribratus LeConte, 1876
 Micralcinus kalmbachi Buchanan, 1927
 Micralcinus maculatus (Blatchley, 1916)
 Micralcinus parvulus
 Micralcinus stehri Sleeper, 1955

References

Further reading

 
 
 

Molytinae
Articles created by Qbugbot